Jorge Eduardo Londoño (born November 25, 1960) is a Colombian politician, who served as the Minister of Justice and Law. Londoño also previously served as the Governor of Boyaca and in 2010 was elected Senator with 62,848 votes as a member of the Green Alliance.

References 

Living people
Colombian politicians
1960 births
Ministers of Justice and Law of Colombia